Respect Graduate School is a private Islamic graduate school located in Bethlehem, Pennsylvania. The school opened in 2015 and is currently focused on offering a Master of Arts in Islamic Studies (MAIS) degree. 

The MAIS degree program at Respect Graduate School (RGS) offers two tracks of study for students. For instance, students may choose from either the Academic or the Professional track of the program to complete their study. The academic track of the MAIS program is designed for students who aim to continue their education onto the Ph.D. level in preparation for an academic career. The professional track of the program, on the other hand, is for students who are interested in a wider array of careers such as Islamic ministry, chaplaincy, education, Islamic finance, inter-religious relations, international relations, or journalism. RGS is dedicated to promoting interfaith and intrafaith dialogue and holds regular events open to the public in cooperation with the Lehigh Dialogue Center and Moravian Theological Seminary. RGS also offers a summer program called Al-Mizan Summer Youth Institute that aims to prepare high school aged students for college.

References

External links

Respect Library

Universities and colleges in Northampton County, Pennsylvania
Religion in Pennsylvania
Education in Pennsylvania
Educational institutions established in 2015
2015 establishments in Pennsylvania
Graduate schools in the United States
Islamic universities and colleges in the United States
Libraries in Pennsylvania
Seminaries and theological colleges in Pennsylvania
Private universities and colleges in Pennsylvania